Albert Carter may refer to:

 Albert E. Carter (1881–1964), American politician
 Albert Desbrisay Carter (1892–1919), Canadian World War I ace pilot
 Albert Carter (footballer) (1898–?), English association football player of the 1920s
 Al Carter (born 1952), American reporter and sports columnist

See also
Al Carter (disambiguation)